Ropica albomaculata is a species of beetle in the family Cerambycidae. It was first described by Pic in 1945 in Vietnam.

References

albomaculata
Beetles described in 1945